Jacques Bizard (1642 – December 5, 1692) was seigneur of île Bonaventure, later renamed île-Bizard. Born in Benaix, Neuchâtel to a Calvinist pastor, Bizard served in the Venetian army where he met Louis de Buade, better known as Comte de Frontenac. The two men later served together in the French army where Bizard was made aide-de-camp to Frontenac. 

After Frontenac's appointment as Governor General of New France, Bizard accompanied him and landed in Quebec City in 1672. A few years later, he was sent to Montreal to investigate claims of illegal sale of alcohol to the Natives. However, the leader of the smugglers, Montreal Governor François-Marie Perrot, imprisoned Bizard. With the help of Frontenac, Bizard was liberated and Perrot was removed from office. A year later, in 1678, he was granted île Bonaventure on which he created a seigneury. That very same year, he married Jeanne-Cécile Closse. The couple had 9 children, 4 of whom would live to adulthood.

During his tenure as seigneur, he continued Perrot's illegal alcohol trade. Despite being condemned by prominent Montrealers for this action, his friendship with Frontenac protected him from any legal actions.

Jacques Bizard Bridge, which connects Île Bizard to Montreal Island, was named after him.

References

External links 
 Biography at the Dictionary of Canadian Biography Online

1642 births
1692 deaths
People from the canton of Neuchâtel
People of New France